Schwede is a surname. Notable people with the surname include:

Franz Schwede (1888–1960), German politician
Bianka Schwede (born 1953), German rower
Tobias Schwede (born 1994), German footballer

See also
Schwedes, a surname

German-language surnames
Ethnonymic surnames